Tylomys is a genus of rodent in the family Cricetidae. 
It contains the following species:
 Chiapan climbing rat (Tylomys bullaris)
 Fulvous-bellied climbing rat (Tylomys fulviventer)
 Mira climbing rat (Tylomys mirae)
 Peters's climbing rat (Tylomys nudicaudus)
 Panamanian climbing rat (Tylomys panamensis)
 Tumbala climbing rat (Tylomys tumbalensis)
 Watson's climbing rat (Tylomys watsoni)

References

 
Rodent genera
Taxa named by Wilhelm Peters
Taxonomy articles created by Polbot